Agiye Hall (born 2003) is an American football wide receiver. Hall attended and played high school football at Bloomingdale High School in Valrico, Florida and began his college career at Alabama in 2021.

Early years
Hall attended Bloomingdale High School in his hometown of Valrico, Florida, where he played football and ran track. Hall was rated a four-star prospect and committed to play college football at Alabama over offers from Georgia, LSU, Michigan, Miami and Oregon.

College career

Alabama
As a true freshman, Hall appeared in seven games and recorded four receptions for 72 receiving yards. In the 2022 College Football Playoff National Championship game against Georgia, Hall played in relief of Jameson Williams following a knee injury and finished the game with two receptions for 52 yards in the 33–18 loss.

Texas 
On August 12, 2022, Hall was suspended indefinitely by the Longhorns following his arrest for criminal mischief. On December 2022, Hall entered the transfer portal for a second time.

College statistics

References

External links
 Alabama Crimson Tide bio

2003 births
Living people
American football wide receivers
Alabama Crimson Tide football players
Players of American football from Florida
People from Valrico, Florida
Sportspeople from Hillsborough County, Florida